Gaussian broadening refers to broadening effects in spectral lines, these can be produced by Doppler broadening.

This effect is similar to Gaussian blur effect in image processing produced by convolution with the Gaussian function.

The term is named after Carl Friedrich Gauss.

Emission spectroscopy
Scattering